The 1982 Prague Skate was held in November 1982 in Prague. Medals were awarded in the disciplines of men's singles, ladies' singles, pair skating, and ice dancing.

Men

Ladies

Pairs

References

Prague Skate
Prague Skate